The Institute for Adult Learning Singapore (IAL)  is an autonomous institute within the Singapore University of Social Sciences (SUSS). IAL provides training for adult educator (or AE) and undertakes research in adult learning within the Training and Adult Education industry.

History
IAL was established in 2008 to provide training for adult educators and undertake research in adult learning. From 1 April 2019, IAL was restructured into an autonomous institute within Singapore University of Social Sciences (SUSS).

Programmes
IAL offers Certificate, Diploma, Master and Continuing Professional Development programmes. The programmes are:

Certificate
WSQ Advanced Certificate in Learning and Performance (ACLP)
WSQ Workplace Learning Facilitator (WLF)

Diploma
WSQ Diploma in Design and Development of Learning for Performance (DDDLP)

Master
Master of Learning and Professional Development (MLPD)

Adult Education Professionalisation (AEP) 
In 2014, the Adult Education Professionalisation (AEP) was launched by IAL. There are three levels of AEP namely Associate Adult Educators (AAE), Specialist Adult Educators (SAE) with either Curriculum Development or Facilitation track or Adult Education Fellows (AEF).

References

External links
 

Singapore University of Social Sciences